Anolis danieli is a species of lizard in the family Dactyloidae. The species is endemic to Colombia.

Etymology
The specific name, danieli, is in honor of Colombian monk Brother Daniel Gonzalez Patiño (1909–1988), who was Director of the Museo de Historia Natural, Instituto de La Salle in Bogotá.

Habitat

Description

Reproduction
A. danieli is oviparous.

References

Further reading
Nicholson KE, Crother BI, Guyer C, Savage JM (2012). "It is time for a new classification of anoles (Squamata: Dactyloidae)". Zootaxa 3477: 1–108. (Dactyloa danielsi, new combination, p. 82).
Velasco JA, Hoyos JM (2010). "Phylogenetic analysis of the latifrons series of Anolis (Sauria: Iguania) with morphological data". Anolis Newsletter 6: 203–212.
Williams EE (1988). "New or Problematic Anolis from Colombia. V. Anolis danieli, a New Species of the latifrons Species Group and a Reassessment of Anolis apollinaris Boulenger, 1919". Breviora (489): 1–13.

Anoles
Endemic fauna of Colombia
Reptiles of Colombia
Reptiles described in 1988
Taxa named by Ernest Edward Williams